Francis Roberts (1609–1675) was an English clergyman.

Francis Roberts may also refer to:
 Francis H. Roberts (1784–1809), servant of the East India Company 
 Francis Roberts (cricketer) (1882–1916), English cricketer
 Frank Roberts (boxer) (Francis Roy Roberts, 1945–2011), the first indigenous Australian Olympian
 Francis Roberts (MP), member of parliament for Bishop's Castle in 1621

See also
 Frank Roberts (disambiguation)
 Thomas Francis Roberts (1860–1919), Welsh academic